A  Christmas jumper (also Christmas sweater) is a sweater themed with a Christmas or winter-style design, often worn during the festive season. They are often knitted. A more traditional approach is a roll neck (or "turtleneck") top-pulled garment. It can generally be said that embellishments such as tinsel, reindeer, or sparkles make a sweater "ugly," in terms of ugly sweaters.

History
In the United Kingdom, Christmas jumpers became popular during the 1980s after a variety of television presenters such as Gyles Brandreth and Timmy Mallett began wearing them during the Christmas holidays. In particular, their popularity may be attributed to the influence of singers such as Andy Williams and Val Doonican, who appeared in these type of jumpers in their television Christmas specials. In Ireland, The Late Late Show'''s host wears an extravagant jumper for the Christmas Late Late Toy Show.  They are often seen as a hand-made present knitted by an elderly relative that are given as a Christmas present. During the 1990s and 2000s they were seen as gag gifts and fell out of favour and featured as something to be embarrassed by as in the 2001 film Bridget Jones's Diary. They gained camp appeal during the 2010s, with online retailer Amazon reporting an increase in sales of 600% in 2011, and the trend has been followed by a number of celebrities. Ugly Christmas Sweater Contests are held annually in the United States.

In 2012, the British newspaper The Daily Telegraph described them as "this season's must have", with retailer Topman selling 34 different designs alone and reporting sales had increased 54% compared to 2011. Higher end fashion labels have also produced Christmas jumpers, including Burberry and Jil Sander, and even metal band Slayer released one as part of their merchandise range.

The charity Save the Children runs an annual Christmas Jumper Day each year in December using the slogan "Make the world better with a sweater". It encourages people to raise money for the charity by wearing their Christmas jumpers on a specific day. The New York Times'' reported in 2012 that a major venue for sweater sales are independent company websites, with ugly-sweater themed names.

Environmental charity Hubbub reported in 2019 that up to 95% of Christmas jumpers are made using plastic, and that two-fifths of them are worn only once. A spokeswoman for Hubbub described the Christmas jumper as "one of the worst examples of fast fashion" and urged people to "swap, buy second-hand or re-wear" rather than buy new.

References

External links

Sweaters
1990s fashion
1990s fads and trends
2010s fads and trends
2010s fashion
Jumper
Jumper
Christmas